Morfasso (locally ) is a comune (municipality) in the Province of Piacenza in the Italian region Emilia-Romagna, located about  west of Bologna and about  south of Piacenza.

The municipality of Morfasso contains the frazioni (subdivisions, mainly villages and hamlets) Rusteghini, Greghi, Casali, Monastero, Pedina, San Michele, Sperongia, and Teruzzi.

Morfasso borders the following municipalities: Bardi, Bettola, Bore, Farini, Gropparello, Lugagnano Val d'Arda, Vernasca.

Demographic evolution

References

External links
 www.comune.morfasso.pc.it/
 www.socris.it/

Cities and towns in Emilia-Romagna